The 2022 Ball State Cardinals football team represent Ball State University during the 2022 NCAA Division I FBS football season. The Cardinals are led by seventh-year head coach Mike Neu and play their home games at Scheumann Stadium in Muncie, Indiana. They compete as members of the West Division of the Mid-American Conference.

Schedule

Coaching staff

References

Ball State
Ball State Cardinals football seasons
Ball State Cardinals football